The Hawaii High School Athletic Association (HHSAA) State Football Championship consists of the two games that are played annually to crown the Division 1 and Division 2 state football champions in Hawaii. Before 1999, when the State Football Championship game was instituted, Hawaii did not crown an official state champion in football and instead held the Oahu Prep Bowl, which matched up the champions of the two football leagues on Oahu to play.

As of 2016, the Hawaii High School Athletic Association board approved for a three-tier football state championship format, which will go into effect. The number of teams in the Divisional tournaments vary each year.

History of the Oahu Prep Bowl
In the early years of prep football the question of "who's the best high school football team in the state" could never be answered as Hawaii never conducted a state championship. This all changed in 1973 when Bill Smithe of the Oahu Interscholastic Association (OIA) and Clay Benham of the Interscholastic League of Honolulu (ILH) struck a deal where the champions from each league met to decide who was the best team in the state. The game was initially called the Oahu Bowl, marking the first time that league champions played each other in the postseason. Though the bowl game did not include neighbor island champions, it was considered Hawaii's state championship. In 1974, the name was changed from Oahu Bowl to the Oahu Prep Bowl and the game became an annual tradition.

Past Oahu Prep Bowl Championship Results

Prep Bowl Past Champions Record (Championships/Runners-Up)
St. Louis (14-3)
Waianae (4-10)
KS-Oahu (3-2)
Pac-Five (2-0)
Iolani (1-0)
Kaiser (1-0)
Leilehua (1-1)
Radford (1-1)
Nanakuli (0-1)
Punahou (0-1)
Farrington (0-1)
Kahuku (0-5)

Past HHSAA State Football Championship Results

Open Division

Division I

Division I & Open Championship Game wins and appearances by school

Division II

Division II Championship Game wins and appearances by school

2007 HHSAA Tournament Brackets

Division I

DIVISION I STATE CHAMPION: Leilehua

RUNNER-UP: St. Louis

Division II

DIVISION II STATE CHAMPION: 'Iolani

RUNNER-UP: Lahainaluna

2008 HHSAA Tournament Brackets

Division I

* Denotes overtime game

DIVISION I STATE CHAMPION: Punahou 

RUNNER-UP: Leilehua

Division II

DIVISION II STATE CHAMPION: 'Iolani

RUNNER-UP: Radford

2009 HHSAA Tournament Brackets

Division I

Division II

* Denotes overtime game

DIVISION II STATE CHAMPION: 'Iolani

RUNNER-UP: Kauai

2010 HHSAA Tournament Brackets

Division I

Division II

* Denotes overtime game

DIVISION II STATE CHAMPION: 'Iolani

RUNNER-UP: Kaimuki

2011 HHSAA Tournament Brackets

Division I

DIVISION I STATE CHAMPION: Kahuku

RUNNER-UP: Punahou

Division II

DIVISION II STATE CHAMPION: 'Iolani

RUNNER-UP: Waipahu

2012 HHSAA Tournament Brackets

Division I

DIVISION I STATE CHAMPION: Kahuku

RUNNER-UP: Punahou

Division II

DIVISION II STATE CHAMPION: 'Iolani

RUNNER-UP: Lahainaluna

2013 HHSAA Tournament Brackets

Division I

DIVISION I STATE CHAMPION: Punahou

RUNNER-UP: Mililani

Division II

DIVISION II STATE CHAMPION: Kaiser

RUNNER-UP: Kaua'i

2014 HHSAA Tournament Brackets

Division I

DIVISION I STATE CHAMPION: Mililani

RUNNER-UP: Punahou

Division II

DIVISION II STATE CHAMPION: 'Iolani

RUNNER-UP: Lahainaluna

2015 HHSAA Tournament Brackets

Division I

DIVISION I STATE CHAMPION: Kahuku

RUNNER-UP: St. Louis

Division II

DIVISION II STATE CHAMPION: Radford

RUNNER-UP: Kapa'a

2016 HHSAA Tournament Brackets

Open Division

OPEN DIVISION STATE CHAMPION: St. Louis

RUNNER-UP: Kahuku

Division I

DIVISION I STATE CHAMPION: Mililani

RUNNER-UP: 'Iolani

Division II

DIVISION II STATE CHAMPION: Lahainaluna

RUNNER-UP: Kapa'a

2017 HHSAA Tournament Brackets

Open Division

OPEN DIVISION STATE CHAMPION: St. Louis

RUNNER-UP: Kahuku

Division I

DIVISION I STATE CHAMPION: Hilo

RUNNER-UP: Damien

Division II

* Denotes overtime game

DIVISION II STATE CHAMPION: Lahainaluna

RUNNER-UP: Konawaena

2018 HHSAA Tournament Brackets

Open Division

OPEN DIVISION STATE CHAMPION: St. Louis

RUNNER-UP: Mililani

Division I

DIVISION I STATE CHAMPION: Waipahu

RUNNER-UP: Hilo

Division II

DIVISION II STATE CHAMPION: Lahainaluna

RUNNER-UP: Kapa'a

2019 HHSAA Tournament Brackets

Open Division

OPEN DIVISION STATE CHAMPION: St. Louis

RUNNER-UP: Kahuku

Division I

DIVISION I STATE CHAMPION: Hilo

RUNNER-UP: 'Iolani

Division II

DIVISION II STATE CHAMPION: Lahainaluna

RUNNER-UP: Kapa'a

2021 HHSAA Tournament Brackets

Open Division

OPEN DIVISION STATE CHAMPION: Kahuku

RUNNER-UP: St. Louis

Division I

DIVISION I STATE CHAMPION: 'Iolani

RUNNER-UP: Lahainaluna

Division II

DIVISION II STATE CHAMPION: Kapa'a 

RUNNER-UP: KS-Maui

All state tournaments games are held at Farrington High School’s Skippa Diaz Stadium due to construction at Aloha Stadium.

2022 HHSAA Tournament Brackets

Open Division

OPEN DIVISION STATE CHAMPION: Kahuku

RUNNER-UP: Punahou

Division I

DIVISION I STATE CHAMPION: Konawaena

RUNNER-UP: Waipahu

Division II

DIVISION II STATE CHAMPION: Waimea

RUNNER-UP: King Kekaulike

HHSAA Division Classification

* Private School

Classifications as of 2022 season

Open Division

Division I

Division II

8 Man**

* Private School
** The HHSAA does not recognize a championship sport unless three or more leagues participate.

External links
 - SportsHigh.com: 2009 Football Championships
 - SportsHigh.com: Tournament Record Book

References

1999 establishments in Hawaii
High school football games in the United States
High school sports in Hawaii
Recurring sporting events established in 1999